Wisconsin NORML is the National Organization for the Reform of Marijuana Laws (NORML) affiliate for the U.S. state of Wisconsin. As of 2019, Alan Robinson serves as Executive Director of Wisconsin NORML.

History
In the 1990s, Ben Masel was the organization's director. In 2010, Gary Storck served as president of Wisconsin NORML.  The chapter has had several past executive directors / presidents, including Jason Galespie, Alan Robinson and Jay Selthofner.

Wisconsin NORML gave Governor Tony Evers a B+ rating.

See also

 List of cannabis organizations
 Cannabis in Wisconsin

References

External links
 

Cannabis in Wisconsin
Cannabis organizations
National Organization for the Reform of Marijuana Laws
Organizations based in Wisconsin